Electrical storm  may refer to:
 A thunderstorm
 A medical condition of chaotic electrical activity of the heart, usually manifested by ventricular tachycardia
 Electrical Storm (song), song by U2
 Electrical Storm (album), the debut solo album by Ed Kuepper
 An Electric Storm, the debut album by White Noise